Automated flight attending involves the use of automation to replace some of the tasks that are currently done by flight attendants.

Examples

Food delivery
In 1965, Martin Limanoff created one of the earliest automated food delivery systems, consisting of a square box that was designed to travel up and down the aisle along a monorail track on the cabin floor. However, it is not known if this was ever used on commercial flights. In 2015, Sell GMBH, a German division of aeroplane equipment company Zodiac Aerospace, filed patent for a food delivery mechanism that would distribute food using automated conveyor belts, allowing passengers to access their food on demand by pressing buttons on the in-flight entertainment system, causing the food distributor to rise out of the floor.

Food order
Many In-flight entertainment systems, such as Virgin America’s ‘Red’ playbook and Panasonic Avionics’ eX2, allow passengers to order food or drink using the IFE touchscreens. A passenger selects one of the meal options available for purchase, swipes his a credit card through the in-seat ordering system and then a flight attendant brings the meal to his seat.

Drink dispensing
Introduced in 2012, The SkyTender is a robot bartender which can dispense more than 30 different drinks, including soft drinks, coffee, wine, and cocktails, at the touch of a button or two. The SkyTender took its first flight on the German airline, WDL Aviation, going from Cologne to Palma, Majorca.

In popular culture
Premiered on May 2, 2015, comedy show Saturday Night Live featured fictional automated flight attendants on the airline company Virgin America.

See also
 Autopilot
 Delivery drone
 Unmanned aerial vehicle

References

In-flight passenger facilities
Travel technology
Aircraft cabin components